The Central Business District of iTowers of Masa Square CBD is located at Gaborone, Botswana. The CBD was constructed in 2015. The iTowers include hotels and government offices.

References

Buildings and structures in Gaborone
Commercial buildings in Botswana
Commercial buildings completed in 2015
2015 establishments in Botswana